Vicki is a 1953 American film noir directed by Harry Horner and starring Jeanne Crain and Jean Peters. It was based on the novel I Wake Up Screaming, written by Steve Fisher.

Plot
Vicki Lynn (Jean Peters) is a waitress who is transformed into a fashion model by press agent Steve Christopher (Elliott Reid). When Vicki is murdered, detective Ed Cornell (Richard Boone) tries to blame the crime on Christopher.

In fact, the cop knows who the real killer is, but he is so hopelessly in love with the dead girl Vicki, who herself despised him, that he intends to railroad an innocent man to the electric chair. With the help of Vicki's sister Jill (Jeanne Crain), Christopher tracks down the real killer, Harry Williams (Aaron Spelling) and exposes the crooked cop Cornell, who had manipulated Williams into murdering Vicki.

Cast
 Jeanne Crain as Jill Lynn
 Jean Peters as Vicki Lynn
 Elliott Reid as Steve Christopher
 Richard Boone as Lt. Ed Cornell
 Max Showalter as Larry Evans (as Casey Adams)
 Alexander D'Arcy as Robin Ray (as Alex D'Arcy)
 Carl Betz as Detective MacDonald
 Aaron Spelling as Harry Williams
 John Dehner as Captain J. Donald

Background
Vicki is a remake of the 1941 film I Wake Up Screaming starring Betty Grable, Victor Mature, and Carole Landis.

Reception
Film critic Bosley Crowther certainly did not like the screenplay, but seemed to appreciate the acting.  He wrote, "Meanwhile, the rest of the performers—Jean Peters, as the girl who gets killed; Jeanne Crain, as her misgiving sister; Mr. Reid and several more—make the best of Harry Horner's brisk direction to make it look as though they're playing a tingling film. It might be, indeed, if the story were not so studiously contrived and farfetched, and if Mr. Boone did not wear a label that virtually says, 'I'm IT.'"

References

External links
 
 
 
 
 Vicki information site and DVD review at DVD Beaver (includes images)
 

1953 films
1953 crime drama films
20th Century Fox films
American black-and-white films
American crime drama films
Remakes of American films
Film noir
Films based on American novels
Films directed by Harry Horner
Films scored by Leigh Harline
1950s English-language films
1950s American films